Carter Mark Jenkins (born September 4, 1991) is an American actor. He is best known for his roles in the films Aliens in the Attic (2009), Valentine's Day (2010), and Struck by Lightning (2012). On television, Jenkins was part of the main cast of Surface (2005–06), Viva Laughlin (2007), and Famous in Love (2017–2018).

Early life
Jenkins was born in Tampa, Florida to Mary and Eric Jenkins, and was raised in Carrollwood, Florida, where he attended Independent Day School. His family later moved to Sherman Oaks, Los Angeles. He has an older brother, Renneker Jenkins, who is also an actor, and an older sister, Tiffany. Like his character in Keeping Up with the Steins, Jenkins was raised Jewish, and attended Hebrew school.

Career
Jenkins began performing in community theatre, and then on local and national commercials. He played lead roles in the television series Surface (2005–06) and Viva Laughlin (2007), and guest starred in episodes of CSI: Miami, House, CSI: NY, Without a Trace, The Bernie Mac Show, and Unfabulous. He has also starred in feature films such as Bad News Bears and Keeping Up with the Steins, and starred in the television film Life Is Ruff.

In 2009, Jenkins appeared in the film Aliens in the Attic, playing the lead role Tom Pearson. In 2010, he appeared in the romantic-comedy Valentine's Day, playing Alex Franklin, the boyfriend of Emma Roberts' character. Jenkins had a supporting role in the 2012 coming-of-age comedy-drama Struck by Lightning, which starred Chris Colfer, who also wrote the screenplay. In 2015, Jenkins portrayed one of the main roles in the supernatural thriller film Nightlight. He starred as Rainer Devon on Freeform's Famous in Love from 2017 to 2018. In 2020, he joined the cast of the After film franchise.

Filmography

Film

Television

References

External links
 
 Carter Jenkins' fashion shoot in The Block. Issue 20 - Fame

1991 births
21st-century American male actors
American male child actors
American male film actors
American male television actors
Jewish American male actors
Living people
Male actors from Los Angeles
Male actors from Tampa, Florida
People from Los Angeles
People from Tampa, Florida
21st-century American Jews